EITM may refer to:

Enterprise IT Management
Elliot in the Morning
Trim Aerodrome, the ICAO code for the airport in Ireland